La Corte de Familia (translated Family Court) is a Spanish-language reality court show that aired on Telemundo from 2000 to 2005. The show was presided over by judge Cristina Pérez. The show is a spin-off (and sister show) of La Corte del Pueblo.

References

External links

Telemundo original programming
American television spin-offs
2000 American television series debuts
2005 American television series endings
Court shows